The Man of the Day was a 1997 Romanian film directed by Dan Pița.

Cast
 Ștefan Iordache as Andrei
 Alina Chivulescu as Ana
 George Mihăiță as Florentin
 Victor Rebengiuc as Gral. Vlădescu
 Maia Morgenstern
 Cristian Iacob
 Costel Constantin
 Vlad Rădescu
 Vladimir Găitan
 Șerban Celea as Redactorul șef
 Liana Ceterchi
 George Alexandru
 Lia Bugnar
 Robert Mușatescu
 Mihai Niculescu
 Liviu Crăciun
 Monica Davidescu
 Constantin Drăgănescu
 Ion Haiduc
 Mircea Constantinescu
 Doru Ana
 Păstorel Ionescu
 Iancu Lucian
 Nicolae Iliescu
 Alin Câmpan
 Papil Panduru
 Dana Săvuică
 Ioana Moldovan
 Mariana Liurca
 Bogdan Vodă
 Alexandru Jitea
 Ion Bechet
 Marian Gheorghe
 Marian Chirvase
 Petrache Petre
 Alexandru Georgescu
 Emil Mureșan
 Adrian Drăgușin

References

External links
 

1990s Romanian-language films
1997 films
Films directed by Dan Pița
1997 drama films
Romanian political films